The A-League Men Young Footballer of the Year is an annual association football award given to the player aged 23 or under at the start of the season who has been judged to have had the best season of any young player in the A-League Men. It is currently called the NAB Young Footballer of the Year for sponsorship purposes. The award has been presented since the 2005–06 season and the winner is chosen by a panel of experts and media representatives. In 2014, the age for eligibility was lifted from 21 to 23.  The first winner of the award was Perth Glory midfielder Nick Ward.

As of 2017, Mathew Ryan and Jamie Maclaren are the only players to have won the award on more than one occasion. Marco Rojas is the only non-Australian winner of the trophy. Players aged 23 or under at the start of the season remain eligible to win the Johnny Warren Medal, and in 2013 Rojas won both awards.

Since 2009, one player has been awarded a nomination for the award each month of the season, with the eventual winner then selected from the nominees.

Winners

The award has been presented on 14 occasions as of 2019, with 12 different winners.

Breakdown of winners

By nationality

By club

See also
Johnny Warren Medal
A-League Golden Boot

References

A-League Men trophies and awards
Australian soccer trophies and awards
Association football young player of the year awards
Rookie player awards